The Kaohsiung Municipal Rueisiang Senior High School (RSSH) is a senior high school located at Cianjhen District, Kaohsiung, Taiwan, is the first comprehensive junior-senior high school (完全中學) of Kaohsiung City. At the present, it has 2960 junior high school students of 72 classes, 947 senior high students of 24 classes and 240 members of faculty and staff.

History 
Ruei-Siang was founded as a junior high school in 1983, being reorganized as a comprehensive junior-senior high school in 1995.

Principal 
Mr. Chao, Lian-Chu (趙連出) 1983-2004
Mr. Wu, Tse-Min (吳澤民) 2004-2011
林香吟 2011-
莊訓當

School Motto 
Be sincere 敦
Be moral 品
Be strongly encouraging 勵
Be learning actively 學

List of Student Clubs 

Debate
English Culture
Japanese
Basketball
Table Tennis
Editing
Badminton
Pop Music
Guitar
Volunteer
Astrology (RSAC)
Movies
Internet
Pop Dance
Happiness & Entertainment
Paintball
Chinese chess
Igo (Japanese chess)
Bridge (Card game)

There are also some student clubs in the junior department, but the time and the content are different from those of senior high.

Sports Games in 2008 
Ruei-Siang broke the tradition having lasted for 25 years. The Sports Games and the anniversary celebration was in the same date before (except for the 25th anniversary), but in 2008, the school separated the date of the anniversary celebration and the Sports Games. The Sports Games in 2008 was held on November 7, 2008, and the anniversary would be held at the next semester (Sep, 2008~ June, 2009.

Transportation
The school is accessible within walking distance south of Lizihnei Station of Kaohsiung LRT.

External links

 Ruei-Siang official website

1983 establishments in Taiwan
Educational institutions established in 1983
High schools in Taiwan
Schools in Kaohsiung